Sandes may refer to:

 Sandes (software)
 Sandes (surname)

See also
 Sandies, a type of cookie
 Sandys (disambiguation)
 Sands (disambiguation)